Dahlquist, Dahlqvist or Dahlkvist is a surname of Swedish origin which may refer to:

Dahlquist
 Jon Dahlquist, founder of Dahlquist High Fidelity Speakers
 Charles W. Dahlquist II (born 1947), president of the Young Men organization of the Church of Jesus Christ of Latter-day Saints
 Chris Dahlquist (born 1962), U.S. ice hockey player
 Gene Dahlquist (born 1942), American football player and coach
 Germund Dahlquist (1925–2005), Swedish mathematician
 Gordon Dahlquist, U.S. playwright and novelist
 John E. Dahlquist (1896–1975), U.S. Army general and World War II division commander
 Michael Dahlquist (1965–2005), drummer in the Seattle band Silkworm

Dahlqvist
 Alfred Dahlqvist (1914–1983), Swedish cross country skier
 Lars Dahlqvist (1935–1969), Swedish Nordic combined skier
 Robert Dahlqvist (1976–2017), guitarist of Thunder Express
 Åke Dahlqvist (1901–1991), Swedish cinematographer

Dahlkvist
 Lisa Dahlkvist (born 1987), Swedish football player
 Sven Dahlkvist (born 1955), Swedish former footballer

Fictional
 John Ezra Dahlquist, the protagonist of the Robert A. Heinlein short story The Long Watch

Surnames
Swedish-language surnames